Suspekt is a Danish hip hop group. They are known for their dark, intense style, which has sometimes been described as horrorcore. The group consists of rappers Bai-D (Andreas Bai Duelund) and Orgi-E (Emil Simonsen), as well as producer Rune Rask. Former member Troo.L.S (Troels Nielsen) announced in 2008 that he would move to the United States to work, as a producer, with hip hop/R&B artist Akon.

In 1998, they founded the record label Tabu Records.

In 2009, the Suspekt members joined forces with rapper L.O.C., forming the group Selvmord.

Collaborations 
 The composer Frederik Magle has composed and arranged music for symphony orchestra on the album Elektra

Discography

Studio albums

Other albums

Singles

Other charted songs

DVDs/Videos
2004: Danske videoer dér (Various Artists)
2004: Ingen slukker The Stars (DVD)
2008: Prima Nocte DVD – er du dum eller hva'!?
2009: Tabu-Records 10 års jubilæum

Tabu Records

Suspekt have their own record label, Tabu Records, which they founded in 1998 Tabu Records consists of the Copenhagen-born Rune Rask, Emil Simonsen (Orgi-E), Andreas Bai Duelund (Bai-D), Troels Nielsen (Troo.L.S) and Kasper Færk. The record company has signed artists like Suspekt, VETO, JO:EL, Jeppe Rapp, Marwan, The Floor Is Made of Lava, Kasper Spez, Orgi-E, Troo.L.S

References

External links 
 Upcoming Suspekt concerts
 

Danish hip hop groups
Musical groups established in 1997